The 1995 Pacific typhoon season occurred all year round, unusual in that most tropical cyclones tend to form in the northwestern Pacific Ocean between May and November.

The scope of this article is limited to the Pacific Ocean, north of the equator and west of the international date line. Storms that form east of the date line and north of the equator are called hurricanes; see 1995 Pacific hurricane season. Tropical storms formed in the entire west Pacific basin were assigned a name by the Joint Typhoon Warning Center. Tropical depressions in this basin have the "W" suffix added to their number. Tropical depressions that enter or form in the Philippine area of responsibility are assigned a name by the Philippine Atmospheric, Geophysical and Astronomical Services Administration or PAGASA. This can often result in the same storm having two names.

Season summary 

31 tropical cyclones formed this year in the Western Pacific, of which 26 became tropical storms. 8 storms reached typhoon intensity, five of them achieving super typhoon strength.

Systems

Tropical Depression 01W 

A circulation started to develop and spawned a tropical disturbance near the equator but east of the International Dateline on December 30, 1994. The system remained stationary for several days until it finally gathered some warm waters and low to moderate windshear on January 5. With that, the JTWC classified it as Tropical Depression 01W as it crossed the basin early on January 7. Moving northeastwards, it entered an area of high vertical windshear, cool waters and weak convection and dissipated on January 9.

Tropical Storm Chuck 

Chuck stayed in the ocean.

Tropical Storm Deanna (Auring) 

Deanna did a loop in the northeastern South China Sea.

Tropical Storm Eli 

Eli stayed at sea.

Typhoon Faye (Bebeng) 

Tropical Depression 05W formed on July 15 and was named Faye the next day as it intensified into a tropical storm. On July 19, Faye became the first typhoon of the season, tied for the second latest date of the first typhoon with 1977, only behind Otto of 1998. It tracked northwestward and eventually reached a peak of  1-min winds and a minimum pressure of 950 millibars. Faye turned northward, and after weakening slightly it hit the south coast of South Korea on the 23rd, before accelerating east-northeastwards and becoming extratropical. 16 people were reported dead, with moderate damage from flooding.

On July 23, 1995, when the typhoon passed South Korea, a rogue wave hitting Pusan Harbor, the largest port in South Korea, resulting in two ships collided.

Tropical Depression 06W 

6W passed close to the Philippines.

Severe Tropical Storm Gary 

On July 27, an area of low pressure near the Philippines later strengthened into Tropical Depression Gary. On July 28, Gary further strengthened into a tropical storm. After bringing torrential downpours and flooding to the Philippines, Gary moved northwest into the South China Sea. Gary intensified even further into a severe tropical storm on July 30 and made landfall near Shantou on July 31. On August 2, after moving inland, Gary dissipated.

Gary claimed four lives in Shantou. Near Taiwan, four fishing vessels sank, with two people dead and 19 others missing.

Severe Tropical Storm Helen (Karing) 

On August 7, Helen formed as a tropical depression about 1200 km east of Manila. Moving northwestwards, Helen soon intensified into a tropical storm on August 9. On August 11, Helen further intensified into a typhoon and made landfall about 60 km northeast of Hong Kong. On August 13, Helen rapidly weakened and soon dissipated.

In Guangdong Helen claimed 23 lives. It also brought many landslides and flooding.

Tropical Storm Irving (Diding) 

On August 17, an area of low pressure in the South China Sea became Tropical Depression Irving. The following morning, Irving became a tropical storm and moved north at 15 km/h. On August 20, Irving again became a tropical depression, and made landfall on the Leizhou Peninsula. Irving then started losing strength rapidly and soon dissipated.

Tropical Storm Janis (Etang) 

An active monsoon trough developed Tropical Storm Janis, forming on August 17 and becoming a tropical storm on the 21st. Another tropical depression to Janis's west merged with the storm, weakening it rather than the typical strengthening after a merger. Janis continued northwestward, eventually restrengthening to a 65 mph tropical storm before hitting eastern China. It recurved to the northeast, and hit near Seoul, South Korea, on the 26th. The storm brought more rain to an area hit by a typhoon only a month before, causing an additional 45 deaths and $428.5 million in damage.

Tropical Depression 11W 

11W did not last for long.

Typhoon Kent (Gening) 

A tropical wave was detected by the Joint Typhoon Warning Center on August 24. On August 25, it was classified as Tropical Depression 12W by the JTWC. The Japan Meteorological Agency (JMA) also upgraded the disturbance to a tropical depression later that day. At the same time, the Philippine Atmospheric, Geophysical and Astronomical Services Administration (PAGASA) named 12W, Gening from its list of pacific typhoon names. On August 26, Gening intensified into a tropical storm and was named Kent by the Joint Typhoon Warning Center. Kent then quickly intensified into a typhoon on August 27 as it drifted slowly west-northwest. It quickly intensified and reached peak intensity as a Category 4 super typhoon on August 29. The storm also reached a low barometric pressure of 945 millibars during that time. Continuing west-northwest, the eye of Typhoon Kent passed over the Philippine island of Basco. Kent then undergo an eyewall replacement cycle later that day and started to weaken. Kent also weakened below super typhoon status as it accelerated towards China. After landfall, the Joint Typhoon Warning Center issued its final warning on September 1 as Kent dissipated. The Japan Meteorological Agency also issued its final advisory on Kent.

Kent caused 52 casualties, as well as $89 million in damage (1995 USD).

Severe Tropical Storm Lois 

Lois hit Vietnam as a typhoon.

Typhoon Mark 

Mark raced off the northeast away from land.

Tropical Storm Nina (Helming) 

Nina hit the Philippines and China.

Tropical Depression 16W 

16W was a weak but long lived depression that passed through the Philippines.

Typhoon Oscar 

In Tokyo, numerous buildings sustained severe damage from high winds and several major highways were shut down. At least 20 people were injured by flying debris in Japan. One person was killed in a landslide and another drowned in a flood. Seven more people were killed by Typhoon Oscar throughout the country. Three other people were also listed as missing due to the storm. Losses from the storm throughout Japan amounted to 612.3 million yen (US$6.7 million).

Typhoon Polly (Ising) 

Polly recurved out to sea.

Typhoon Ryan (Luding) 

The monsoon trough spawned a tropical depression over the South China Sea on September 14. It drifted northwestward, becoming a tropical storm on the 16th and a typhoon on the 19th. As Ryan turned northeastward, it rapidly intensified to become a super typhoon on the 21st at 155 mph, the first ever to form and reach that intensity in the South China Sea. The super typhoon passed south of Taiwan, and weakened to a 110 mph typhoon as it made landfall on southwestern Japan on the 23rd. Ryan only caused 5 deaths on its path.

Severe Tropical Storm Sibyl (Mameng) 

108 fatalities and $38.5 million in damage (1995 USD) can be attributed to Tropical Storm Sibyl as it crossed the central Philippines on September 29. Sibyl actually strengthened while passing through the archipelago due to the contraction of the wind field.

Tropical Depression 21W 

21W did not last long.

Tropical Depression 22W 

22W was only tracked by the JTWC.

Tropical Depression 23W 

23W lasted a day.

Severe Tropical Storm Ted 

Ted hit China.

Tropical Storm Val 

Val moved erratically over open water.

Typhoon Ward (Neneng) 

Ward recurved out to sea.

Severe Tropical Storm Yvette (Oniang) 

Yvette hit Vietnam as a severe tropical storm.

Typhoon Zack (Pepang) 

Like Sibyl, Zack strengthened while crossing the central Philippines on October 28. The typhoon continued to intensify over the South China Sea to a 140 mph storm, but weakened to a 115 mph typhoon as it made landfall on eastern Vietnam on the 1st. Zack caused 110 deaths and heavy damage from flooding.

Typhoon Angela (Rosing) 

The monsoon trough that developed Yvette and Zack spawned another tropical depression on October 25. It moved to the west, organizing very slowly to become a tropical storm on the 26th. 2 days later Angela became a typhoon, and from the 31st to the 1st Angela rapidly intensified to a  super typhoon. It maintained that intensity as it moved westward, hitting the Philippines on the 2nd as a slightly weaker  storm. Angela continued to the west-northwest, where upper-level winds caused it to dissipate on the 7th over the Gulf of Tonkin. Angela caused 9.33 billion Philippine Pesos (1995 pesos) in damage across the Philippines, resulting in 882 fatalities.

Tropical Storm Brian 

Brian stayed away from land.

Tropical Storm Colleen 

A non-tropical low area developed well far to the northwest of Hawaii on November 9. The low pressure area began slowly acquiring subtropical characteristics as it moved southwest before crossing the International Date line on November 11, as the JTWC issued a TCFA later on the same day. Early on the 12th the JTWC began advisories on Tropical Storm Colleen as the low pressure area acquired enough tropical characteristics, Not long after being designated, Colleen then moved westward as strong wind shear disheveled the small storm, causing it to dissipate on November 13.

The Japanese Meteorological Agency did not track Colleen as a tropical storm.

Tropical Depression 32W/33W (Sendang) 

Tropical Depressions 32W and 33W, though operationally treated as two separate cyclones, were in actuality one system; a relative rare event that shows the difficulties of tracking poorly organized storms. 32 developed on November 30 east of the Philippines. Operationally it was said to have tracked to the northeast and dissipated, with a second area of convection to the west becoming 33W. 32's convection became disorganized with the shower activity heading northeastward, but the low level circulation remained behind and headed westward to be called 33. The depression headed west-southwest, where it brought heavy rain to the Philippines on the 4th and 5th, killing 14 people. The most recent example prior to this system that had two names was Tropical Storm Ken-Lola in the 1989 Pacific typhoon season.

Tropical Depression 34W 

34W stayed at sea.

Severe Tropical Storm Dan (Trining) 

Dan did not affect land.

Storm names 

During the season 24 named tropical cyclones developed in the Western Pacific and were named by the Joint Typhoon Warning Center, when it was determined that they had become tropical storms. These names were contributed to a revised list from mid-1989. However this is the last season using this naming list since the JTWC revised a new naming list in 1996.

Philippines 

The Philippine Atmospheric, Geophysical and Astronomical Services Administration uses its own naming scheme for tropical cyclones in their area of responsibility. PAGASA assigns names to tropical depressions that form within their area of responsibility and any tropical cyclone that might move into their area of responsibility. Should the list of names for a given year prove to be insufficient, names are taken from an auxiliary list, the first 10 of which are published each year before the season starts. Names not retired from this list will be used again in the 1999 season. This is the same list used for the 1991 season. PAGASA uses its own naming scheme that starts in the Filipino alphabet, with names of Filipino female names ending with "ng" (A, B, K, D, etc.).

Retirement 
Due to an extreme death toll caused by Typhoon Rosing in the Philippines, PAGASA later retired the name Rosing and was replaced by Rening for the 1999 season.

Season effects 
This table summarizes all the systems that developed within or moved into the North Pacific Ocean, to the west of the International Date Line during 1995. The tables also provide an overview of a systems intensity, duration, land areas affected and any deaths or damages associated with the system.

|-
| 01W ||  || bgcolor=#| || bgcolor=#| || bgcolor=#| || Marshall Islands || None || None ||
|-
| Chuck ||  || bgcolor=#| || bgcolor=#| || bgcolor=#| || Marshall Islands, Caroline Islands ||  None || None ||
|-
| TD ||  || bgcolor=#| || bgcolor=#| || bgcolor=#| || Ryukyu Islands || None || None ||
|-
| TD ||  || bgcolor=#| || bgcolor=#| || bgcolor=#| || None || None || None ||
|-
| TD ||  || bgcolor=#| || bgcolor=#| || bgcolor=#| || South China || None || None ||
|-
| Deana (Auring) ||  || bgcolor=#| || bgcolor=#| || bgcolor=#| || Philippines, Taiwan, Ryukyu Islands ||  None || None ||
|-
| Eli ||  || bgcolor=#| || bgcolor=#| || bgcolor=#| || None || None || None ||
|-
| TD ||  || bgcolor=#| || bgcolor=#| || bgcolor=#| || South China || None || None ||
|-
| TD ||  || bgcolor=#| || bgcolor=#| || bgcolor=#| || Vietnam || None || None ||
|-
| TD ||  || bgcolor=#| || bgcolor=#| || bgcolor=#| || None || None || None ||
|-
| TD ||  || bgcolor=#| || bgcolor=#| || bgcolor=#| || Vietnam || None || None ||
|-
| Faye ||  || bgcolor=#| || bgcolor=#| || bgcolor=#| || Mariana Islands, Ryukyu Islands, Korean Peninsula || Unknown ||  ||
|-
| 06W ||  || bgcolor=#| || bgcolor=#| || bgcolor=#| || Philippines || None || None ||
|-
| Gary (Bebeng) ||  || bgcolor=#| || bgcolor=#| || bgcolor=#| || Philippines, China || None ||  ||
|-
| TD ||  || bgcolor=#| || bgcolor=#| || bgcolor=#| || South China, Vietnam || None || None ||
|-
| TD ||  || bgcolor=#| || bgcolor=#| || bgcolor=#| || None || None || None ||
|-
| Helen (Karing) ||  || bgcolor=#| || bgcolor=#| || bgcolor=#| || Philippines, South China || None ||  ||
|-
| TD ||  || bgcolor=#| || bgcolor=#| || bgcolor=#| || None || None || None ||
|-
| Irving (Diding) ||  || bgcolor=#| || bgcolor=#| || bgcolor=#| || South China ||  None || None ||
|-
| Janis (Etang) ||  || bgcolor=#| || bgcolor=#| || bgcolor=#| || Philippines, Taiwan, Ryukyu Islands, Korean Peninsula ||  ||  ||
|-
| 11W ||  || bgcolor=#| || bgcolor=#| || bgcolor=#| || Ryukyu Islands || None || None ||
|-
| TD ||  || bgcolor=#| || bgcolor=#| || bgcolor=#| || None || None || None ||
|-
| Kent (Gening) ||  || bgcolor=#| || bgcolor=#| || bgcolor=#| || Philippines, Taiwan, China ||  ||  ||
|-
| Lois ||  || bgcolor=#| || bgcolor=#| || bgcolor=#| || South China, Vietnam, Laos, Thailand || None || None ||
|-
| Mark ||  || bgcolor=#| || bgcolor=#| || bgcolor=#| || None || None || None ||
|-
| Nina (Helming) ||  || bgcolor=#| || bgcolor=#| || bgcolor=#| || Philippines, South Korea ||  None || None ||
|-
| 16W ||  || bgcolor=#| || bgcolor=#| || bgcolor=#| || Vietnam || None || None ||
|-
| TD ||  || bgcolor=#| || bgcolor=#| || bgcolor=#| || None || None || None ||
|-
| Oscar ||  || bgcolor=#| || bgcolor=#| || bgcolor=#| || Mariana Islands, Japan ||  ||  ||
|-
| Polly (Ising) ||  || bgcolor=#| || bgcolor=#| || bgcolor=#| || None || None || None ||
|-
| Ryan (Luding) ||  || bgcolor=#| || bgcolor=#| || bgcolor=#| || Philippines, Taiwan, Japan || None || None ||
|-
| Sibyl (Mameng) ||  || bgcolor=#| || bgcolor=#| || bgcolor=#| || Philippines, China ||  ||  ||
|-
| 21W ||  || bgcolor=#| || bgcolor=#| || bgcolor=#| || Vietnam || None || None ||
|-
| 22W ||  || bgcolor=#| || bgcolor=#| || bgcolor=#| || None || None || None ||
|-
| 23W ||  || bgcolor=#| || bgcolor=#| || bgcolor=#| || Vietnam || None || None ||
|-
| Ted ||  || bgcolor=#| || bgcolor=#| || bgcolor=#| || Philippines, South China || None || None ||
|-
| Val ||  || bgcolor=#| || bgcolor=#| || bgcolor=#| || Mariana Islands ||  None || None ||
|-
| TD ||  || bgcolor=#| || bgcolor=#| || bgcolor=#| || None || None || None ||
|-
| Ward (Neneng) ||  || bgcolor=#| || bgcolor=#| || bgcolor=#| || Mariana Islands || None || None ||
|-
| Yvette (Oniang) ||  || bgcolor=#| || bgcolor=#| || bgcolor=#| || Philippines, Vietnam, Cambodia, Laos, Thailand || Unknown || Unknown ||
|-
| Zack (Pepang) ||  || bgcolor=#| || bgcolor=#| || bgcolor=#| || Caroline Islands, Philippines, Vietnam, Cambodia || None ||  ||
|-
| Angela (Rosing) ||  || bgcolor=#| || bgcolor=#| || bgcolor=#| || Caroline Islands, Philippines, South China, Vietnam ||  ||  ||
|-
| Brian ||  || bgcolor=#| || bgcolor=#| || bgcolor=#| || Mariana Islands ||  None || None ||
|-
| Colleen ||  || bgcolor=#| || bgcolor=#| || bgcolor=#| || None || None || None ||
|-
| 32W/33W (Sendang) ||  || bgcolor=#| || bgcolor=#| || bgcolor=#| || Philippines || None ||  ||
|-
| 34W ||  || bgcolor=#| || bgcolor=#| || bgcolor=#| || Vietnam || None || None ||
|-
| Dan (Trining) ||  || bgcolor=#| || bgcolor=#| || bgcolor=#| || Caroline Islands, Philippines || Unknown || Unknown ||
|-

See also 

 1995 Pacific hurricane season
 1995 Atlantic hurricane season
 1995 North Indian Ocean cyclone season
 South-West Indian Ocean cyclone season: 1994-95, 1995-96
 Australian region cyclone season: 1994-95, 1995-96
 South Pacific cyclone season: 1994-95, 1995-96

References

External links 
 Japan Meteorological Agency
 Joint Typhoon Warning Center .
 China Meteorological Agency
 National Weather Service Guam
 Hong Kong Observatory
 Macau Meteorological Geophysical Services
 Korea Meteorological Agency
 Philippine Atmospheric, Geophysical and Astronomical Services Administration
 Taiwan Central Weather Bureau
 Satellite movie of 1995 Pacific typhoon season